Henry Dornan (14 February 1916 – 4 December 1990) was a Scottish footballer who played for Kilmarnock and made 'guest' appearances during the Second World War for Dumbarton and Celtic.

References

1916 births
1990 deaths
Scottish footballers
Kilmarnock F.C. players
Dumbarton F.C. wartime guest players
Celtic F.C. wartime guest players
Association football fullbacks
Scottish Football League players